Judith is a 1923 Dutch silent film directed by Theo Frenkel.

Cast
 Helena Makowska - Gravin Judith
 E. Paul - Graaf Robert de Bertan
 Adolf Klein - Markies Emile de Fers
 Claire Rommer - Louise
 Ernst Rückert - Baron Gaston de Noel
 Heinz Salfner - Charles Delcourt
 Theo Mann-Bouwmeester - Charles Delcourts moeder
 Olga Limburg - Olga Tatschowa
 Oscar Marion - Dr. George Delcourt
 Julie Meijer - (as Julie Frenkel)

External links 
 

1923 films
Dutch silent feature films
Dutch black-and-white films
Films directed by Theo Frenkel